Fishel Jacobs is an American-Israeli rabbi, martial artist, ex-Israel prison service officer, author, and speaker.

Early years and education
Jacobs was born in 1956 in Brooklyn, raised in Vermont, and has lived in Israel since 1979. In 1974, Jacobs earned a black belt in karate from the International Tang Soo Do Association. He graduated from the University of Vermont.
 Jacobs holds a PhD degree (equivalency) from the Israel Department of Religion, and completed training as a Rabbinic attorney
from the Harry Fischel Institute for Talmudic Research. In 2006, he was promoted to Eighth Degree Black Belt Master Instructor by Dr. Grandmaster Tae Yun Kim.

Work
After spending fourteen years studying in the rabbinical school, Tomchei Temimim, in Kfar Chabad, Israel, Jacobs served as emissary of the Lubavitcher Rebbe, Rabbi Menachem Schneersohn from 1998 to 2007, and the Chabad-Lubavitch Campus chaplain at Tel Aviv University. Concurrently, from 1992 until 2005 he served as a full-time chaplain, a staff-officer with the rank of Major, in the Israel Prison Service (IPS).

In 2005, Jacobs published the first book describing life within the IPS, republished in 2016 under the title Coffee Melts Bars: My Israeli Prison Career. He is also the author of the Two Kings series of children's books.

Jacobs is a Chabad-Lubavitch Rabbi and speaker. He has published ten non-fiction books, including works on difficult areas of practical Talmudic law. His interviews, articles and columns have appeared in Jewish and mainstream media.

Jacobs is the responding rabbi for a few websites that deal in practical Talmudic law. He performs karate demonstrations while speaking at college campuses, youth groups, communities and corporations.

Personal life
Jacobs is married to Miriam, the Director of Tan"ach (scriptural commentaries) division of Beth Rivkah Seminary, Kfar Chabad. They have seven children.

Publications
 Family Purity: A Guide to Family Purity, Campus Living and Learning (2000)
 Israel Behind Bars: True Stories of Hope And Redemption, (2005)
 Blech Book – Complete & Illustrated Guide, Merkos Linyonei Chinuch (2007)
 Two Kings, Israel Bookshop Publications (2009).
 Coffee Melts Bars: My Israeli Maximum Security Prison Life, Gefen Publishing (2016)

References

External links
Fishel Jacobs Official site

Living people
1956 births
American Hasidic rabbis
Israeli Hasidic rabbis
American religious writers
Israeli male writers
University of Vermont alumni
American expatriates in Israel
Jewish American writers
Israeli male karateka
American male karateka
Orthodox rabbis from New York City
People from Brooklyn
Chabad-Lubavitch emissaries
Israeli chaplains